The Army Act, 1950 is an Indian legislation governing military law in the Indian Armed Forces.

History
The Army Act 1950 was passed by the Parliament on 22 May 1950 and came into effect on 22 July 1950.

References

Military of India
Acts of the Parliament of India 1950
Military law